Ash Sha'ir District is a district of the Ibb Governorate, Yemen. As of 2003, the district had a population of 39,805 inhabitants.

References

Districts of Ibb Governorate
Ash Sha'ar District